The Flag of the Association of Southeast Asian Nations is one of the official symbols of the Association of Southeast Asian Nations (ASEAN). It consists of the official emblem of ASEAN on a blue background.

Design

Construction
Set upon a blue background, ten paddy or rice stalks are drawn in the middle of a red circle with white circumference.

The colours of the flag are specified as follows:

The ratio of width to length of the flag is 2:3. The ASEAN Charter includes size specifications for usage of the flag:
 Table flag: 10 cm x 15 cm
 Room flag: 100 cm x 150 cm
 Car flag: 20 cm x 30 cm
 Field flag: 200 cm x 300 cm

Symbolism
The official symbolism of the flag is detailed in the ASEAN Charter. 

The colours of the flag – blue, red, white, and yellow – represent the main colours of the national flags of all ten ASEAN member states. Blue represents peace and stability, red represents courage and dynamism, white represents purity, and yellow represents prosperity.

The stalks of rice represent the dream of ASEAN's Founding Fathers for an ASEAN comprising all the countries in Southeast Asia bound together in friendship and solidarity. The number of stalks symbolize ASEAN's ten members

The circle represents the unity of ASEAN.

History

ASEAN's previous flag was similar to the current one - it had six paddy stalks representing the five founding members (Indonesia, Malaysia, Philippines, Singapore, and Thailand), plus Brunei Darussalam (joined on 7 January 1984) and the word ASEAN written under the stalks. The background was white instead of blue, the border of the circle along with the word ASEAN was cyan, and the circle was bright yellow. The stalks themselves were golden brownish in colour.

References

External links
 ASEAN - Official description of the flag
 ASEAN Charter
 Flag of the World - Description at FotW along with history

Flag
Association Of Southeast Asian Nations